Ojstrica is a dispersed settlement in the hills north of Dravograd in the Carinthia region in northern Slovenia.

The parish church in the settlement is dedicated to John the Baptist and belongs to the Roman Catholic Archdiocese of Maribor. It dates to 1480 with various later additions.

Gallery

References

External links

Ojstrica on Geopedia

Populated places in the Municipality of Dravograd